Wandawe is a genus of sub-Saharan African jumping spiders first described by G. N. Azarkina and C. R. Haddad in 2020, including one species moved from Colaxes and two newly described species. The name pays tribute to Polish zoologist Wanda Wesołowska, a major contributor jumping spider research.  it contains only three species: W. australis, W. benjamini, and W. tigrina.

See also
 Colaxes
 List of Salticidae genera

References

Further reading

Salticidae genera
Spiders of Africa